British artist and sculptor born Worcestershire, England in 1966. He is a practicing public artist whose most notable creation is the Shot at Dawn Memorial which is sited at the National Memorial Arboretum. Other notable works include the Piper's Memorial at Longueval, the ATS Memorial at the National Memorial Arboretum, the SIGINTers Memorial at GCHQ and the Rugeley Miners Memorial.

References
2. "Miners statues unveiled in Rugeley".Express and Star

3. "The pipers' monument". Webmatters

1966 births
Living people
People from Worcestershire (before 1974)
British sculptors
British male sculptors